Trustfall is the ninth studio album by American singer Pink. The album was released on February 17, 2023, through RCA Records. Her first studio album since Hurts 2B Human (2019), Pink worked on the production and lyrics with Fred Again, David Hodges, Max Martin, Johnny McDaid and Shellback. The Lumineers, Chris Stapleton and First Aid Kit feature as guest vocalists.

Trustfall received generally positive reviews from music critics. The album debuted highly on record charts across the globe, reaching number 1 in multiple countries, such as Australia, Canada, and the UK, while reaching number 2 in the US, becoming Pink's 5th consecutive top-2 album in her home country.

Background
After the publication of her eighth studio album Hurts 2B Human in 2019, Pink collaborated on "One Too Many" with Keith Urban and "Anywhere Away from Here" with Rag'n'Bone Man. On May 21, 2021, the singer released All I Know So Far, a documentary chronicling Pink on her record-breaking Beautiful Trauma World Tour. The project was promoted by two new original songs "Cover Me in Sunshine" and "All I Know So Far", as well as a live album. During a 2021 interview, promoting the documentary, Pink was questioned about her next studio album. When asked about the tone of the album, she replied saying she was not sure as it was in the "early days" but that it would be "very honest".

On July 14, 2022, Pink surprise released her first single since 2021, "Irrelevant", as a protest song in response to her outrage with the overrule of Roe v. Wade by the U.S. Supreme Court.

From May to October 2022, Pink headlined at Bottlerock Napa Valley, Ohana Festival, and Austin City Limits, while also performing a show at Yaamava Theater in Southern California. She also played at the second Taylor Hawkins Tribute Concert in Los Angeles and the Foo Fighter's Hanukkah Sessions.

Composition and production 
Primarily a dance-pop album, Trustfall incorporates elements of a wide variety of sub-genres, namely pop rock, Americana, country music, and folk. Some tracks also contained military drums and the playing of solo piano and guitar stomps. Lyrically, Trustfall contains themes of self-motivation, self-acceptance, vulnerability, spirituality, afterlife, loss and love.

In an interview with Billboard, Pink explained the meaning of the album and the recording process:"The sequencing of this album was really important to me, in case someone does listen to it from start to finish. Because life is like this to me, it’s an emotional roller coaster and it’s a journey, and this album is that. [...] But that’s not life. Life is messy and beautiful and messy again. [...] It was three years in the making. "Lost Cause" and "Never Gonna Not Dance Again" were the two album-starters. And "Never Gonna Not Dance Again" was my reaction to adrenal fatigue, cortisol, stress. It was like, "If the world’s ending and we’re sliding sideways off our axis, I’m gonna get my roller skates. Let’s take a cocktail class online! What are we doing?" So those songs on the record were a reaction to, "I can’t care all the time. I also need to feel joy, and let that s–t run off my back."

Release and promotion
On November 18, 2022, Pink announced Trustfall on Good Morning America and its release date through her social media accounts. She stated that the album is "the best album [she] had ever made". The album was inspired by many personal events in her life including her children getting sick and her father's death. On October 6, 2022, Pink announced that she would be touring in the UK and Europe as part of her Pink Summer Carnival Tour in 2023. North American dates were announced a month later. On October 17, 2022, Pink teased the album's lead single "Never Gonna Not Dance Again" and released a snippet on social media. The song became available to stream on Apple Music and Spotify on November 4, 2022. One critic gave the song a mixed review saying they felt it was too similar to "Can't Stop the Feeling!" by Justin Timberlake. She performed the song live for the first time at the American Music Awards on November 20, 2022.

On January 18, 2023, Pink announced the album's second single "Trustfall" and released a snippet on social media. Pink appeared on The Kelly Clarkson Show on February 6, 2023. On February 14, 2023, Pink released a promotional single, "When I Get There", written by Amy Wadge and David Hodges in honor of Pink's late father Jim Moore.

Critical reception 

Upon release, Trustfall was met with a positive response from music critics. At Metacritic, which assigns a normalised rating out of 100 based on reviews from mainstream critics, the album received a score of 71 out of 100, based on reviews from nine critics, indicating "generally favorable reviews".

Maura Johnston of Rolling Stone wrote that the songs on Trustfall lyrically "don't shy away from irascibility or eye-rolling" but "feel like they're coming from a genuine place" and that "Pink's appeal comes from her ability to turn the everyday into the stereo-ready". Cady Siregar of Consequence found the singer "still wearing her emotions on her sleeve, keen to embrace a deep sense of vulnerability as she processes some extremely difficult events", publishing her "most overt attempt at storytelling and introspection" in her discography. However, Siregar wrote that Pink "is playing it safe" because "trying to radiate emotional honesty without the risk of coming off as slightly banal is something even the best pop stars find hard to do".

In a mixed review, Michael Cragg of The Guardian wrote that the album is "patchy but playful in places", showing a "reliably Pink", thanks to her voice, "the key element" of not  "always up to scratch" materials.

Commercial performance 
The album debuted at number one on the UK Albums Chart with over 65% of its total made up of physical sales, becoming Pink's fourth album  and her third consecutive to do so, following Beautiful Trauma (2017) and Hurts 2B Human (2019). The album also debuted at number two on the Official Vinyl Albums Chart. In Australia, the album debuted at number one on the Australian Albums Chart, becoming her seventh number-one album in the country. In the United States, the album debuted at number two on the Billboard 200 with 74,500 album-equivalent units, of which 59,000 were pure album sales. This is Pink's first album since Funhouse (2008) to not debut at #1.

Track listing

Notes
  signifies a co-producer
  signifies an additional producer
  signifies a vocal producer

Personnel
Musicians

 Pink – lead vocals (all tracks), background vocals (tracks 1, 2, 5, 8)
 David Hodges – background vocals, guitar, piano, programming (1)
 Fred – background vocals, bass guitar, drums, guitar, keyboards, programming (2)
 Johnny McDaid – background vocals (2)
 Byron Isaacs – background vocals, bass guitar (4)
 James Felice – background vocals (4)
 David Baron – bass guitar (4)
 Jeremiah Fraites – drums, electric guitar, percussion, piano, synthesizer (4)
 Wesley Schultz – vocals (4)
 A Strut – background vocals, drums, programming (5)
 Elvira Anderfjärd – background vocals (5)
 Klara Söderberg – background vocals, guitar (5)
 Johanna Söderberg – background vocals (5)
 Fat Max Gsus – bass guitar (5)
 Max Martin – background vocals, keyboards, programming (6)
 Shellback – background vocals, bass guitar, drums, guitar, keyboards, percussion, programming (6)
 Wojtek Goral – alto saxophone (6)
 Tomas Jonsson – baritone saxophone, tenor saxophone (6)
 David Bukovinszky – cello (6)
 Helena Stjernstrom – English horn (6)
 Mattias Bylund – orchestra, synthesizer (6)
 Magnus Sjölander – percussion (6)
 Noos Johansson – trombone (6)
 Janne Bjerger – trumpet (6)
 Magnus Johansson – trumpet (6)
 Mattias Johansson – violin (6)
 Doris Sandberg – vocals (6)
 Jameson Moon Hart – vocals (6)
 Willow Sage Hart – vocals (6)
 Laura Mace – background vocals (7)
 Maize Jane Olinger – background vocals (7)
 Greg Kurstin – bass guitar, drums, electric guitar, keyboards, percussion, synthesizer (7, 9)
 Billy Mann – acoustic guitar, arrangement, background vocals, bass guitar, programming (8)
 Pete Wallace – arrangement, programming (8)
 Aaron Sterling – drums (8)
 Justin Derrico – electric guitar, mandolin (8); guitar (13)
 Stephen Wrabel – background vocals, piano (10)
 Sam de Jong – programming, strings (10)
 Jason Evigan – background vocals, guitar (11)
 Nate Mercereau – guitar (11)
 Jessica Karpov – piano (12)
 John Ormond – bass guitar (13)
 Chris Stapleton – electric guitar, vocals (13)

Technical

 Randy Merrill – mastering (1, 3–5, 7–13)
 Dave Kutch – mastering (2, 6)
 Mark "Spike" Stent – mixing (1, 3, 8–10, 12, 13)
 Serban Ghenea – mixing (2, 4–7, 11)
 David Hodges – engineering (1)
 Bryce Bordone – engineering (2, 4–7, 11)
 Fred – engineering (2)
 Graham Archer – engineering (2)
 Johnny McDaid – engineering (2)
 David Baron – engineering (4)
 Lasse Mårtén – engineering (6)
 Sam Holland – engineering (6)
 Mattias Byland – engineering (6)
 Greg Kurstin – engineering (7, 9, 13)
 Julian Burg – engineering (7, 9, 13)
 Matt Tuggle – engineering (7, 9, 13)
 Aaron Sterling – engineering (8)
 Billy Mann – engineering (8)
 Justin Derrico – engineering (8)
 Pete Wallace – engineering (8)
 Jesse Shatkin – engineering (12)
 Vance Powell – engineering (13)
 Matt Wolach – engineering assistance (1, 3, 8–10, 12, 13)
 Will Reynolds – engineering assistance (2)
 Renée Hikari – engineering assistance (3)

Charts

Certifications

Release history

References

2023 albums
Albums produced by Max Martin
Albums produced by Shellback (record producer)
Pink (singer) albums
RCA Records albums